BrightPoint, Inc. was a provider of "wireless device lifecycle services", specializing in the distribution of wireless devices and in providing customized logistics services to the wireless industry.

BrightPoint had a 2011 revenue of $5.24 billion. With approximately 4,000 employees as well as a significant number of temporary staff, and activity in more than 35 countries, including 13 Latin American countries through its investment in Intcomex, Inc., BrightPoint handled approximately 112 million wireless devices globally in 2011.

BrightPoint's services include distribution, channel development, product customization, E-Business, and other outsourced services.

In 2012, BrightPoint was listed at #463 in the annual Fortune 500 rankings. During July 2012 BrightPoint was acquired by Ingram Micro (NYSE: IM). Six of its top executives shared 30MM USD payout when merged, including Anthony Boor, who is currently not a BrightPoint employee.

References

External links
 Corporate Website

Telecommunications companies of the United States
Companies based in Indiana
Companies established in 1989